The line of control which lies between the Indian and Pakistani controlled parts of the former princely state of Jammu and Kashmir is the de facto boundary which is generally respected by both sides. Indian and Pakistani troops have on occasion tried to alter the areas under their control in large scale operations. There have also been punitive expeditions across the border.

Acts of brutality and mutilation are a regular occurrence along the Line of Control. Armed teams of soldiers and militants are known to cross the border, outnumber a post and inflict heavy casualties and utilize beheading as an act of humiliation. Both sides have blamed each other for carrying out such cross-border attacks and denied their participation in such raids.

Lt. Gen. H. S. Panag, a former Indian army general, states that the Indian military usually used to conceal the incidents of beheading of Indian soldiers. However, nowadays it is becoming increasing difficult to conceal these incidents as soldiers and even porters working at military post have mobile phones. Indian media reports that from 1998 to 2003, Pakistan military conducted around 21 raids in Indian territories. Around 41 Indian soldiers were killed and 76 were injured in those raids.

Since 2021, India and Pakistan agreed to a ceasefire and such incidents have not been reported since.

List of military operations across the LOC

References

Military history of India